Kal-e Sefid or Kal Sefid or Kal Safid may refer to:
 Kal-e Sefid, Ilam
 Kal Sefid, Kermanshah
 Kal-e Sefid, Salas-e Babajani, Kermanshah Province